Deudorix montana is a butterfly in the family Lycaenidae. It is found in Tanzania (the Nyumbenito Mountain and Lugoda in Mufindi) and Malawi.

Adults are on wing in March and April.

The larvae feed on Rutidea fuscescens.

References

Butterflies described in 1985
Deudorigini
Deudorix